Parrya nauruaq is a species of flowering plant in the family Brassicaceae, native to southern Alaska. A subshrub, it grows on gravelly plains and slopes that support little other vegetation.

References

Brassicaceae
Endemic flora of the United States
Flora of Alaska
Plants described in 2007